Amado Aguirre Santiago (February 3 or 8, 1863 in San Sebastián, Jalisco – August 22, 1949 in Mexico City) was a Mexican general and politician.

Biography 
Aguirre was the son of Ignacio Aguirre Peña, the first municipal president of San Sebastián, and Mariana Santiago Lope. He graduated from the mining engineering program in Guadalajara. During the Mexican revolution, he fought under General Manuel M. Diéguez, later joining General Alvaro Obregón. He held a number of positions in the Mexican government, at various levels. From 1916 to 1917, he was constituent deputy, then military commander of Guadalajara, interim governor of Jalisco, member of the inspection commission of the army, senator during the XXVII period, undersecretary of agriculture and development (and president of the Comité Nacional Obregonista, manager of the Caja de Préstamos. He was Secretary of Communications and Public Works from 1921 to 1924, and was governor and military commander of the Federal Territory of Quintana Roo from 1924 to 1925, ambassador to Chile and representative to Brazil and Costa Rica, governor and military commander of the Baja California Sur district from 1927 to 1929, and director of the Heroico Colegio Militar in 1925.

References

External links 
 

Governors of Quintana Roo
Governors of Baja California Sur
Mexican Secretaries of Communications and Transportation
People from Jalisco
1863 births
1949 deaths
Ambassadors of Mexico to Chile
20th-century Mexican politicians